Hawn State Park is a public recreation area located  southwest of Ste. Genevieve, Missouri. The state park's nearly  include three state-designated natural areas: Pickle Creek, LaMotte Sandstone Barrens, and Botkins Pine Woods. Orchid Valley is also considered part of Hawn State Park, but is not connected to the rest of the park and is not open to the public.

History
The park's first 1500 acres were willed to the state in 1952 by the school teacher for whom the park is named, Helen Coffer Hawn. She acquired twelve parcels for purposes of creating a park beginning in 1932.

Activities and amenities
The park offers camping, fishing, picnicking, and hiking on three named trails:  Whispering Pines, White Oak, and Pickle Creek. The trail system intersects the River aux Vases and its tributary Pickle Creek.

References

External links

Hawn State Park Missouri Department of Natural Resources 
Hawn State Park Map Missouri Department of Natural Resources

State parks of Missouri
Protected areas of Ste. Genevieve County, Missouri
Protected areas established in 1955
1955 establishments in Missouri